Shameem Hilaly (born 1947) is a Pakistani actress who has acted in both films and television. She is most famous for acting in PTV Dramas.  She is noted for her performance in  Maigh Malhar during the 1990s. She has also acted in Pakistan's only English language movie, Beyond the Last Mountain (1976).

Background
Hilaly completed her formal education in Lahore from Convent of Jesus and Mary and Kinnaird College for Women. She is married to the former ambassador turned political commentator, Zafar Hilaly. The couple have two children and currently reside in Karachi.

Television
Hilaly's career started from the drama, Alif Noon.

Hum TV
 Shanakht
 Dil e Muzter
 Saiqa
 Maat
 Manay Na Ye Dil
 Ishq Gumshuda
 Malaal
 Kitni Girhain Baqi Hain
 Aey Zindagi
 Dil-e-Jaanam
 Phir Wohi Mohabbat
 Hum Kahan Ke Sachay Thay
 Wehem

Geo TV
 Ek Nazar Meri Taraf
Man Jali
 Meri Behan Maya
 Meri Adhoori Mohabbat
 Dil Hai Chota Sa
 Jal Pari
 Uraan
 Nok Jhonk (TeleFilm Sep 2015)
 Tum Se Hi Talluq Hai
 Dil-e-Gumshuda
 Dil Kiya Karay

ARY Digital
 Morr Us Gali Ka
 Shehr e Dil Ke Darwaze
 Shak
 Goya
 Teri Raza (2017)
 Qurban (2017)
 Tum Milay (2017)
 Mere Paas Tum Ho (2019)
 Prem Gali (2020)
 Neeli Zinda Hai (2021)

Others
 Talkhiyaan
 Parosi (NTM)
 Waqt Ko Tham Lo (PTV)
 Mere Dard Ko Jo Zuban Mile (PTV)
 Coke Kahani (PTV)
 Dil Ki Madham Boliyan (TV ONE)
 Maigh Malhar (NTM)

Filmography
 Beyond the Last Mountain (1976)
 Dobara Phir Se (2016)
 Chalay Thay Saath (2017)
 Motorcycle Girl (2018)
Altered Skin (2018)
 Pinky Memsaab (2018)

References

External links

Shamim Hilaly at nettv4u

Living people
Pakistani television actresses
20th-century Pakistani actresses
21st-century Pakistani actresses
1947 births
People from Lahore
Actresses from Mumbai
Convent of Jesus and Mary, Lahore alumni
Kinnaird College for Women University alumni
Tyabji family